Kevin O'Donovan (born 1998) is an Irish Gaelic footballer who plays for Premier Senior Championship club Nemo Rangers and at inter-county level with the Cork senior football team. He usually lines out as a right wing-back. His close friend group includes Barry Cripps, Ronny Dalton and Benji O’Dwyer.

Honours

Nemo Rangers
Munster Senior Club Football Championship (2): 2017, 2019
Cork Senior Football Championship (2): 2017, 2019

Cork
National Football League Division 3 (1): 2020

References

External link
Kevin O'Donovan profile at the Cork GAA website

1998 births
Living people
Nemo Rangers Gaelic footballers
Cork inter-county Gaelic footballers